The Big Knights is a British animated television series. It was created by Neville Astley and Mark Baker through their studio The Big Knights Ltd., in co-production with BBC Worldwide and in association with BBC Bristol. It was first broadcast on BBC Two over the Christmas season of 1999–2000. It was the first TV series to be digitally animated using CelAction 2D, while the first release of the software was still under development. It is mixed with cutout animation, traditional animation, and flash animation.

The stories tell the adventures of the two Big Knights, Sir Boris and Sir Morris, who are incredibly strong and brave, but are also incredibly dim-witted.  They solve crises, usually of their own creation, but cause great destruction and mayhem in the process.

Setting
The eponymous Big Knights live in Castle Big, on the edge of Forest Big, in the land of Borovia. Borovia seems to be situated in either Central or Eastern Europe. The knights themselves are indeed big; according to the title sequence they are "the height of two men, the weight of four, the strength of sixteen".

Borovia is rife with dragons, witches, trolls, ogres and a race of tiny people. The only real civilisation aside from Castle Big and King Otto's run-down palace is Borodzo, a tiny country town in the middle of nowhere. In the town square was a large gold clock which the incompetent King Otto accidentally spent a huge amount of money upon, only for the Big Knights to destroy it before the King arrived to view it.

The population is negligible, the economy is poor and the army consists mainly of Sir Boris, Sir Morris and their pets, as well as a host of lesser knights who, not being big, tend to take a back seat. This is mainly due to their snobbish elitism and general martial incompetence; they are much happier practising genuflection and brushing up their courtly manners. There does not seem to be much going for Borovia. The land has a fledgling television system (in black and white, consisting mainly of weather reports), at least one car (owned by the King) and an ill-fated hydroelectric dam, along with a failed proton power plant, which runs on pig manure. From this it becomes apparent that Borovia, rather than being merely medieval, is in fact in the modern age, and whether through geographical isolation or sheer indolence, very backward.

The country borders on the land of Moridia, a richer and more prosperous nation. The people there are more intelligent, and are always one step ahead of their envious neighbours. Borovia also borders a land of vampires, which the Big Knights help to get rid of more by accident than design, in the process reviving the land's tourism industry. As lovable as they are, the Big Knights always seem to make life for all Borovians that little bit harder.

Main characters
Sir Boris – The finest swordsman in the world.  Noble, brave, honourable and chivalrous, and while not nearly as stupid as his brother Sir Morris, not terribly bright either.  He is clad in silver armour. He is voiced by David Rintoul.
Sir Morris – Not the finest swordsman in the world, but the most enthusiastic. He is incredibly stupid, once believing that breakfast was magically made by the plates. His general method of dealing with problems is by hitting them with maximum force. He wears glasses, and bronze armour. Voiced by Brian Blessed.
Sir Horace – Sir Boris' loyal hound, clad in armour. He is a fine tracker dog, once tracking a flying crow that had stolen a golden key with his smell alone.
Sir Doris – Sir Morris' pet hamster, likewise clad in plate armour. She has an insatiable appetite and will eat just about anything irrespective of its size or edibility, including Morris' fingers, a bicycle and man-eating plants.
Mrs. Ethel Minion – The knights' housekeeper and de facto nanny, without whom they find survival rather difficult.  She takes a matronly view toward her outsize charges. She seems to enjoy the housework.
King Otto – King of Borovia, and a single parent.  His occasional attempts to modernise his country often fail disastrously at the well-meaning hands of the Big Knights, as well as his desire to cut costs in most situations. He is insipid and dull-headed. He has two daughters, Princess Lucy and Princess Loretta, who manipulate him mercilessly.
Princesses Lucy and Loretta – King Otto's twin daughters. Enthusiastic, naive and oblivious to danger and trouble. They absolutely love adventure and are keen admirers of the Big Knights.
Wizard Zabobon – Wizard and advisor to King Otto. He is very old and it appears that he has never once thought of personal hygiene. He is an incompetent wizard but sometimes offers good advice, which the king ignores.
Professor von Proton – The brain behind Borovia's drive to modernisation, he is also totally insane. He once covered the whole country in pig manure as a result of a quest for cheap renewable power.
Queen Melissa – Queen of Moridia and incredibly wealthy. According to the programme website, she is rumoured to have been married to King Otto at some stage, but this is not mentioned in the show itself. Her fabulous wealth is a constant source of envy to King Otto.
Sorceress Abigail – Cleaner, brighter, female version of Zabobon employed by Queen Melissa.
Sir Kiftsgate – The apparent leader of a new breed of knights who know the difference between bowing to a Duke and an Earl but are totally useless at traditional knightly pastimes such as slaying dragons and ogres.

Style of humour
The Big Knights appeared over the Christmas of 1999/2000, and was lauded for its funny humour and cleverness. Jack and the Beanstalk, for example, is retold from the point of view of a tiny race of people who inhabit Sir Morris' garden. In another episode, an asteroid narrowly misses a new hydroelectric dam, only for the knights' efforts to rescue the princesses to result in the destruction of the dam by Sir Morris hurtling into it from a great height. The theme tune was provided by the Rostov Balalaika orchestra.

Cast
 Alexander Armstrong as Narrator
 David Rintoul as Sir Boris
 Brian Blessed as Sir Morris
 Timothy West as King Otto
 Prunella Scales as Queen Melissa and Aunt Lily
 Morwenna Banks as The Old Witch, and as Ethel Minion, the Big Knights' housekeeper
 Julie Lemieux as Kid
 Brian Sewell as Sir Kiftsgate
 Catherine Disher as Kid
 John Sparkes as Eeuuurgh the Troll, Professor Von Proton, Daring Sir Douglas and Dan Titchy
 Summer Strallen as Princess Lucy
 Scarlett Strallen as Princess Loretta
 Kate Harbour as Mindy
 Gordon Kennedy as Count Vampire and Ogre
 Jonathan Kydd as Neptune
 Kate Robbins as Sorceress Abigail and Aunt Iris
 Enn Reitel as Wizard Zabobon, Mayor Borozo and Jack Tiny

List of episodes
The episodes that are correctly listed with air dates were taken from Radio Times and BBC Genome.
Knights in Distress (19th December 1999)
Ethel and the Imp (19th December 1999)
Knight School (21st December 1999)
Time Protonosphere (21st December 1999)
The Land of Vampires (22nd December 1999)
Sir Morris and the Beanstalk (22nd December 1999)
The Village Games (23rd December 1999)
Alchemy (25th December 1999)
Lost Doris (28th December 1999)
Clockwork Knights (28th December 1999)
The Toll Bridge (29th December 1999)
Proton Power (31st December 1999)
The Royal Escort (3rd January 2000)

International broadcasters 
The series is airing or has aired in the following other countries.

Home video releases
In 2000, 6 episodes were released on VHS (PAL) by BBC Video as The Big Knights: The Big Adventures. "Imagine a cartoon cross between Monty Python and the Holy Grail and Blackadder," suggested OK! in a review of the VHS, "and you're halfway there. Fun for all the family!"
In 2010, all 13 episodes were remastered in high definition by Entertainment One and rereleased as a combined DVD (region 2) and Blu-ray (region B) set titled The Big Knights: Run For Your Lives!.

Awards
2000 Best Adult Animation Series – British Animation Awards (BAA)
2000 Best Use of New Technology – British Animation Awards (BAA)
2001 Best Animation Series – Annecy International Animated Film Festival
2001 Grand Prize for Animated Television Programme at the SICAF International Festival in Korea
2001 Best Commercial Series Animation Award – FAN International Festival of Animation UK

References

External links
 Astley Baker Davies, creators of the Big Knights
 The Big Knights, official YouTube channel.
 TheBigKnights.net - Premier Big Knights Fansite
 

British children's animated comedy television series
British children's animated fantasy television series
British flash animated television series
Television series by Entertainment One
English-language television shows
1999 British television series debuts
2000 British television series endings
1990s British children's television series
2000s British children's television series
1990s British animated television series
2000s British animated television series